Robert A. Kerr (1842 - January 12, 1912) or (December 23, 1833 - January 7, 1913) or (1841 – April 28, 1912) was a barber, shipping clerk, and state representative in Texas. He helped establish the first high school in Bastrop County, Texas for African Americans.

He was born in New Orleans and his father owned him. He was banished from San Antonio for aiding runaway slaves. He was elected to the Texas House of Representatives as a member of the Greenback Party in 1880. He served on the Military Affairs Committee and was an opponent of the convict lease system. He ran unsuccessfully for reelection as a Republican.

References

Members of the Texas House of Representatives
1842 births
1912 deaths